Killadelphia is a 2005 live DVD from American metal band Lamb of God, released on Epic Records and shot and directed by Doug Spangenberg. It consists of footage filmed during the band's two gigs at the Trocadero Theatre in Philadelphia on October 16 and 17 of 2004, hence the pun title of the DVD. In addition to the concert footage lasting more than 70 minutes, Killadelphia includes over 2 hours of behind-the-scenes footage recorded throughout the Ashes of the Wake Tour - also included are three music videos, including the uncensored version of "Now You've Got Something To Die For" and a demo version of "Laid To Rest". Killadelphia reached platinum status in the United States in 2007.

On 13 December 2005, Killadelphia was re-released with an audio CD version of the live concert included in the DVD package.

Track listing
Intro
"Laid to Rest"
On the Road
"Hourglass"
Goddamn!
"As the Palaces Burn"
Late to Denver
"Now You've Got Something to Die For"
I'm Not Willie!
"11th Hour"
"Terror and Hubris in the House of Frank Pollard"
The Brandy and Randy Show
"Ruin"
Wine Soundcheck
"Omerta"
Death from Above
"Pariah"
We've Gone Completely Batty!
"The Faded Line"
English Coffee
"Bloodletting"
Adventures in the UK
"The Subtle Arts of Murder And Persuasion"
Glasgow
 "Vigil"
Afterthoughts
"What I've Become"
Wrap-up
"Black Label"
 Outro / Credits

Music videos
Laid to Rest (Demo Version)
Laid to Rest
Now You've Got Something to Die For

Personnel
Lamb of God
Randy Blythe - vocals
Mark Morton - guitar
Willie Adler - guitar
John Campbell - bass
Chris Adler - drums, percussion
Video Crew
Doug Spangenberg - Director/Producer/Editor
Anderson Bradshaw, Robbie Tassaro - Editors
Audio Crew
Machine - Audio Mix
Dan Korneff - Editing and Sound Design
Mike Roze and Machine - Surround Mixing

Certifications

References

Concert films
Lamb of God (band) video albums
2005 video albums
Documentary films about heavy metal music and musicians